Events from the year 1765 in Scotland.

Incumbents

Law officers 
 Lord Advocate – Thomas Miller of Glenlee
 Solicitor General for Scotland – James Montgomery

Judiciary 
 Lord President of the Court of Session – Lord Arniston, the younger
 Lord Justice General – Duke of Queensberry
 Lord Justice Clerk – Lord Minto

Events 
 May – James Watt makes a breakthrough in the development of the steam engine by constructing a model with a separate condenser, an idea which has come to him in a walk on Glasgow Green.
 Sugar refinery at Greenock opened.
 Settlement at Grantown-on-Spey planned.

Births 
 11 January – John A. Macdonald, first Canadian Prime Minister (died 1891 in Ottawa)
 22 April – James Grahame, poet, lawyer and clergyman (died 1811)
 20 July – Peter Nicholson, architect, engineer and mathematician (died 1844 in Carlisle)
 24 August – Thomas Muir of Huntershill, radical (died 1799 in France)
 24 October – James Mackintosh, polymath (died 1832 in London)

Deaths 
 3 April – Jean Adam, poet and songwriter (born 1704)
 30 November – George Glas, merchant adventurer (born 1725; murdered at sea)

The arts
 First publication of the ballad "Sir Patrick Spens".
 Walter Scott's novel Redgauntlet (1824) presents an alternate history of this year.

References 

 
 Scotland
1790s in Scotland